Pandalosia delicatula is a species of minute sea snail, a marine gastropod mollusk or micromollusk in the family Zebinidae. 

This species occurs in the Atlantic Ocean off the Cape Verdes. The type species was found off Christmas Island.

References

 Laseron C.F. (1956) The families Rissoinidae and Rissoidae (Mollusca) from the Solanderian and Dampierian zoogeographical provinces. Australian Journal of Marine and Freshwater Research 7(3): 384-484. page(s): 393; fig. 12; note: Originally described as Pandalosia depressa
 Rolàn & Luque, The subfamily Rissoininae (Mollusca: Gastropoda: Rissoidae) in the Cape Verde Archipelago (West Africa). Iberus, 18(1), June 2000: 21-94. 50

Gastropods described in 1956
Gastropods of Cape Verde